Myrtia or Myrtea, ( or Μυρτέα) is a village in the municipality of Pyrgos, Elis, Greece.  In 2011, it had a population of 898. It is located on a hillside near the Ionian Sea. It is 3 km southeast of Douneika, 3 km southwest of Alpochori, 3 km north of Skourochori and 9 km northwest of Pyrgos town centre. The Greek National Road 9/E55 (Patras - Pyrgos - Kyparissia) passes northeast of the village.

Population

See also

List of settlements in Elis

External links
Myrtia at the GTP Travel Pages

References

Pyrgos, Elis
Populated places in Elis